Haplogroup I-Z63, also known as I1a3 per the International Society of Genetic Genealogy ('ISOGG), is a Y chromosome haplogroup. It is correlated with a DYS456 value inferior to 15, but there are exceptions.

I-Z63 is most common in England, Scotland, Germany, Fennoscandia and Poland. Its progenitor is assumed to have lived in Jutland at around 2500 BCE. Within Fennoscandia, I-Z63 has a particularly strong association with Finland. To date, ancient I-Z63 has been found archeologically in the Jutland area of Schleswig, Germany along with Poland and Italy.

Origins 
On the basis of analysing samples of volunteers in YDNA sequencing, the YDNA analysis company YFull estimated that I-Z63 formed 4,600 years ago (2600 BC) (95% CI 5,100 <-> 4,000 ybp) with a TMRCA (Time to Most Recent Common Ancestor) of 4,400 years (95% CI 4,900 <-> 3,900 ybp) before present.

Geographically I-Z63 is believed to have arisen in or near what is now Denmark (based in part on the current distribution of this haplogroup). The current distribution of I-Z63 shows that there is a very high concentration of I-Z63 on the British Isles. At the same time, the archeological record presents a strong association of I-Z63 to the Wielbark culture and by extension with the Goths. There is a proposed link between the Goths and British migration, the so-called "Jutish Hypothesis". The "Jutish hypothesis" claims that the Jutes may be synonymous with the Geats of southern Sweden or their neighbours, the Gutes. The evidence adduced for this theory includes:

 primary sources referring to the Geats (Geátas) by alternative names such as Iútan, Iótas and Eotas;
 Asser in his Life of Alfred (893) identifies the Jutes with the Goths (in a passage claiming that Alfred the Great was descended, through his mother, Osburga, from the ruling dynasty of the Jutish kingdom of Wihtwara, on the Isle of Wight), and;
 the Gutasaga (13th Century) states that some inhabitants of Gotland left for mainland Europe; large burial sites attributable to either Goths or Gepids were found in the 19th century near Willenberg, Prussia (after 1945 Wielbark in Poland).

The Jutes invaded and settled in southern Britain in the late 4th century during the Age of Migrations, as part of a larger wave of Germanic settlement in the British Isles. The Jutish migration to Britain may explain the high concentration of I-Z63 found in modern Britain. However, I-Z63 is notably sparse among modern volunteer testers from Denmark. This is surprising because, in a geographical sense, Denmark encompasses the ancient homeland of the Jutes. Foreign invaders displacing the Jutes from their ancient homeland may explain the relative lack of I-Z63 in Denmark. Even in the year 945, the peoples of Jutland were threatened by foreign invaders (yet ironically were posing a threat to other groups elsewhere, such as in England). In 945 King Hacon of Norway arrived in Jutland and slew many of the people there, sending the survivors “far up into the land”. The current distribution of I-Z63 clearly shows that while there is a near absence of I-Z63 in modern Denmark, sizable numbers of I-Z63 men live today in Finland, Norway, Sweden and Aland.

Based on the combined evidence, the preferred current working hypothesis puts the progenitor of I-Z63 in ancient Jutland around the year 2000 BCE.

Archeological Record 

An individual with the subclade of I-Y21381 was found just south of Denmark in the Schleswig Rathausmarkt excavation in Schleswig, Schleswig-Holstein, Germany. This city on the Jutland peninsula is the successor to the important Viking settlement of Hedeby, which was destroyed in 1066. Sample SWG007 was obtained from grave 179 and dated to 1070-1140 CE.

The I-S2077 subclade of haplogroup I-Z63 was sampled on an elite warrior buried in Bodzia (Poland) in a rich burial from ca. 1010-1020 AD. All artefacts there indicate a strong relation to the Kievian Rus ruling elite, so this man who probably succumbed to combat wounds, was in a close relationship with the Kievian Prince, Sviatopolk the Accursed (son of Vladimir the Great), married to a daughter of the Polish king Boleslaw the Great (Burisleifr from the Scandinavian sagas). The cemetery in Bodzia is exceptional in terms of Scandinavian and Kievian Rus links. The Bodzia man (sample VK157, or burial E864/I) was not a simple warrior from the princely retinue, but he belonged to the princely family himself. His burial is the richest one in the whole cemetery, moreover, Strontium analysis of his teeth enamel shows he was not local. It is assumed that he came to Poland with the Prince of Kiev, Sviatopolk the Accursed, and met a violent death in combat. This corresponds to the events of 1018 AD when Sviatopolk himself disappeared after having retreated from Kiev to Poland. It cannot be excluded that the Bodzia man was Sviatopolk himself, as the genealogy of the Rurikids at this period is extremely sketchy and the dates of birth of many princes of this dynasty may be quite approximative. An autosomal PCA plot of sample VK157 against modern populations has revealed that VK157 matches most closely to the present population of Finland. Taking into account that subclade I-BY316/I-Y7626 bears a very strong association with Finland it may be postulated that I-BY316/I-Y7626 may have been at least partially spread over continental Europe by vikings attached to the Kievan Rus who were originally from Finland.

Another archeological sample possibly tied to the Kievan Rus is sample Zeytinliada 14832, which belongs to an 25 to 35 year old adult who lived between 600 and 1000 CE during the Medieval Age and was found in the region now known as Zeytinliada, Erdek, Turkey. This sample has been tied to subclade I-BY316. The genetic profile of this individual does not resemble northern Europeans, so he might be the descendant of a northern European (e.g. part of the Varangian guard of Byzantium) who intermarried with the local population, although a more proximal origin is also possible, as this lineage was found also in Langobards from Hungary. The Rus' provided the earliest members of the Varangian Guard. They were in Byzantine service from as early as 874. Hence it appears plausible that sample Bodzia 157 and Zeytinliada 148 are both connected to the Kievan Rus.

I-Z63 has been traced to the Kowalewko burial site in Poland which dates to the Roman Iron Age. In 2017 Polish researchers could successfully assign YDNA haplogroups to 16 individuals who were buried at the site. Out of these 16 individuals three belonged to haplogroup I-Z63, and in particular subclade I-L1237. The Kowalewko archeological site has been associated with the Wielbark culture. The Wielbark culture in turn has been associated with the Goths. Therefore the subclade I-L1237 of I-Z63 may be seen somewhat as a genetic indicator of the Gothic tribe of late antiquity. There is an academic theory that the Gothic tribe is connected to British migration through the so-called "Jutish Hypothesis", which would explain why I-L1237 is so strongly associated both with British migration and with Gothic migration patterns.

I-Z63 was found in a late 6th Century cemetery in Collegno, Italy, near the city of Torino.  The Collegno  burial site is associated with Gothic and Lombard remains and dated to the late 6th Century.  The remains belong to I-FT104588, which is a subclade of  I-BY316/I-Y7626.  This discovery adds another historical connection of I-Z63 to the Gothic migrations of the early Medieval Period.

Another I-Z63 archeological find at the Crypta Balbi site in Rome was dated to Late Antiquity (400-600 CE) and reported to be Y-DNA haplogroup I-Y7234. Interestingly, Lombard-associated ornaments have been excavated at this site, pointing to connections with central Europe. Additionally, five of the seven individuals from this site, including the I-Z63 individual, were classified by ChromoPainter into a cluster with more haplotype sharing with central/northern Europeans.

Excavated in Hungary, Tiszafüred 798 was a man, associated with the Late Avar cultural group, who lived between 700 and 800 CE during the Medieval Age and was found in the region now known as Majoros-halom, Tiszafüred. Likewise Tiszafüred 509 was a man who lived between 800 and 830 CE. Both were matched to haplogroup I-S10360. Avars, under the rule of a khagan called Bayan, 565 AD, allied with the Longobards and defeated the Germanic Gepides in the Danube Plains. In 7th c. AD they continued raiding Western Europe. They helped the lombard king Grimoald to vanquish a rebellion in Frioul, 663 AD. Hence a plausible explanation exists how a haplogroup which is strongly associated with the Gothic migrations is also attached to the Avar cultural group. Also found in Hungary  was Magyarhomorog 88 who belongs to subclade I-PR683, he was a man who lived between 1000 and 1100 CE during the Medieval Age  and was found in the region now known as Kónyadomb, Magyarhomorog, Hungary.

Significant Subclades 
Even though I-Z63 itself is not considered a Nordic haplogroup, it does with I-BY316/I-Y7626 contain a significant Nordic subclade, whereby I-BY316 is heavily weighted towards Finland, Sweden, Norway, Iceland and Aland.

Prominent members of I-Z63 
Sviatopolk the Accursed (son of Vladimir the Great) is believed to have carried the I-S2077 subclade of Z63. By patrilineal extension this may also make Rurik an I-Z63. 

Governor William Bradford, Mayflower passenger and leader of the Plymouth Colony.  At least two reported descendants have tested under I-Z63 to I-Y21381 > Y21371 > Y21370 > Y21372 > FGC72882.

References 

Human Y-DNA haplogroups
Human evolution
Population genetics
Classical genetics